Shakespear Regional Park is a nature park in the Auckland Region of New Zealand. It is located at the tip of the Whangaparaoa Peninsula, and is named after the Shakespear family which bought the land in the 1880s from local Maori.

The park includes the Tamaki Leadership Centre, a Royal New Zealand Navy base.

Geography

Much of the coastline is lined by sandstone cliffs, which shelter the beach-lined Te Haruhi Bay. At the Park's western border, a narrow lowland separates Okoromai Bay and Army Bay.

Most of the regional park is the Shakespear Open Sanctuary, a collaboration between the Shakespear Open Sanctuary Society and local authorities. Kiwi birds have been spotted in the sanctuary.

A  pest/predator-proof fence across the peninsula, completed in March 2011, protects the park's wildlife. This includes resident invertebrates and lizards, along with birds migrating from the nearby Tiritiri Matangi island sanctuary. Brodifacoum poison airdrops were conducted in July 2011 to eradicate mammalian pests.

History

The Kawerau hapū Ngāti Kahu traditionally inhabited the area, prior to the arrival of Europeans. Ngāti Kahu's major focuses of settlement were around Te Haruhi Bay and Army Bay. Whangaparaoa Peninsula was purchased by the government in 1853, after which settlers began developing the land for grazing. Ngāti Kahu continued to live on the land until the 1890s. The Shakespear family acquired many of the landholdings, and farmed the area for much of the 20th century.

The northern area of the park was acquired by the New Zealand Army during World War II.

In 1967 the Shakespear family sold their land to the Auckland Regional Council, who established the Shakespear Regional Park.

Recreation

There are three main walkways in the park: Heritage Trail, Lookout Track and Tiri Tiri Track.

References 

Hibiscus and Bays Local Board Area
Parks in the Auckland Region
Regional parks of New Zealand
Tourist attractions in the Auckland Region
Wildlife sanctuaries of New Zealand
Hauraki Gulf
Hibiscus Coast